Diplomatic Courier is a 1952 American spy film noir directed by Henry Hathaway and starring Tyrone Power, Patricia Neal and Stephen McNally. The nightclub scene in the film features actor Arthur Blake, famous for his female impersonations, impersonating Carmen Miranda, Bette Davis, and Franklin D. Roosevelt. The plot was loosely adapted from the 1945 novel Sinister Errand by British writer Peter Cheyney.

Plot

Mike Kells is assigned by the State Department to fly to Salzburg and meet his old friend Sam Carew, who will pass a top-secret document to him on a particular train platform. A passenger on the Salzburg-bound plane, Joan Ross, takes a liking to Mike and expresses a desire to see him again.

However, at the set meeting site, Sam ignores him because he is apparently being tailed by two men. Mike boards the same train and sits near a woman Sam seems to know. In a tunnel, Mike is shocked to see the two men throw Carew's body off the train.

Col. Cagle and Sgt. Guelvada of the US Army tersely interrogate Mike as to what went wrong. They believe the woman's involved and order him to travel to Trieste to find her. Guelvada goes along.

She is identified as Janine Betki, a singer and a possible Russian agent. Mike goes to a club where she once performed. He runs into Joan there instead. After a strange man slips Mike some information, the man tries to flee for safety but is murdered in a hit-and-run incident by a car which had almost killed Mike a moment before.

Janine is located and explains to Mike that she not only worked with Carew but also loved him and spied on the Russians on his behalf. Still, the colonel insists Janine was a loyal Soviet agent by showing Mike the dossier on her efforts as a Russian spy, a dossier which was compiled by Carew himself. Joan then contacts Mike and claims a sniper tried to kill her. After he leaves, it is Joan who is revealed to be the Russian agent.

Mike deduces that Carew hid microfilm in a wristwatch. He retrieves the watch from the pawn shop where she left it, only to have Joan try to take it from him at gunpoint before she is surprised and overpowered by the faithful American Sergeant. Meanwhile, a complication arises that no one anticipated because the pawnbroker had cleaned the watch and removed the film. After Mike is captured by the Soviets, Janine successfully bargains for both of their lives by agreeing to give the microfilm to them. In the end, the microfilm is recovered by the American authorities while Mike manages to meet with Janine in the presence of her Soviet spymaster in a compartment on a moving train, where he ultimately facilitates their escape to freedom.

Cast
 Tyrone Power as Mike Kells
 Patricia Neal as Joan Ross
 Stephen McNally as Col. Mark Cagle
 Hildegard Knef as Janine Betki
 Karl Malden as Sgt. Ernie Guelvada
 James Millican as Sam F. Carew
 Stefan Schnabel as Rasumny Platov
 Herbert Berghof as Arnov
 Arthur Blake as Max Ralli
 Helene Stanley as Airline Stewardess
 Lee Marvin as an M.P. (uncredited)
 Warren Oates as Russian agent (uncredited)
 Charles Bronson as Russian agent (uncredited)
 Michael Ansara
 E. G. Marshall
 Nestor Paiva
 Dabbs Greer
 Peter Coe
 Ludwig Stossel

Production
Patricia Neal said she enjoyed her role: "She was a cosmopolite, a free liver, and an exciting person."

Critical reception
Bosley Crowther in The New York Times called it "a picture of no more than middling appeal.The fault seems to lie in the writing. Casey Robinson and Liam O'Brien...have assembled an impressive array of melodramatic occurrences, such as a mysterious murder on a train, muggings in Trieste, double dealings and, of course, a climactic "chase"...But they haven't concocted a story that has clarity or suspense, and Mr. Hathaway has not been able to direct it so that it looks like anything on the screen"; whereas Time Out called it a "Neat, taut espionage thriller".

References

External links

1952 films
1950s spy drama films
Films directed by Henry Hathaway
Cold War spy films
Films set in Austria
Films set in Trieste
Films set in Salzburg
American spy drama films
American anti-communist propaganda films
Film noir
Films shot in Los Angeles
1952 crime drama films
Films scored by Sol Kaplan
20th Century Fox films
American black-and-white films
Films based on British novels
1950s English-language films
1950s American films